Pilatus, also often referred to as Mount Pilatus, is a mountain massif overlooking Lucerne in Central Switzerland. It is composed of several peaks, of which the highest is named Tomlishorn.

Geography and transport

The whole mountain range stretches at least from the Lopper just opposite from Stansstad to the east as far as at least to the Mittaggüpfi and the Risetestock to the west on the border between LU and OW.

The highest peak, Tomlishorn, and the other peaks, such as Widderfeld even further west than the Tomlishorn on the border between LU and OW, Matthorn to the south, the Klimsenhorn to the north (UW), and Rosegg and Windegg to the east, both on the border of UW and OW, should only be approached with appropriate Alpine hiking equipment.

Jurisdiction over the massif is divided between the cantons of Obwalden (OW), Nidwalden (NW), and Lucerne (LU). The main peaks are right on the border between Obwalden and Nidwalden.

The top can be reached with the Pilatus Railway, the world's steepest cogwheel railway, from Alpnachstad, operating from May to November (depending on snow conditions) and the whole year with the aerial panorama gondolas and aerial cableways from Kriens. Two other peaks, closer to the stations are called Esel (Donkey), which lies just east over the railway station, the one on the west side is called Oberhaupt (Head-Leader).

During the summer, the "Golden Round Trip" — a popular route for tourists — involves taking a boat from Lucerne across Lake Lucerne to Alpnachstad, going up on the cogwheel railway, coming down on the aerial cableways and panorama gondolas, and taking a bus back to Lucerne.

History
A few different local legends about the origin of the name exist. One claims that Pilatus was named so because Pontius Pilate was buried there. However, a similar legend is told of Monte Vettore in Italy. Another is that the mountain looks like the belly of a large man, Pilate, lying on his back and was thus named for him. The name may also be derived from "pileatus," meaning "cloud-topped."

Numbered amongst those who have reached its summit are Conrad Gessner, Theodore Roosevelt, Arthur Schopenhauer (1804),  Queen Victoria and Julia Ward Howe (1867).

The cog railway opened in 1889.

The mountain has fortified radar (part of the Swiss FLORAKO system) and weather stations on the Oberhaupt summit, not open to the public view and used all year round.

Gallery

Weather

In literature
In The Chalet School Does It Again. (1955) Elinor Brent-Dyer retells the Pilate burial place legend.

Mount Pilatus plays a pivotal role in the conclusion of Brad Thor's fiction novel Lions of Lucerne.

See also
 List of mountains of Switzerland
 List of most isolated mountains of Switzerland
 List of mountains of Switzerland accessible by public transport
 List of mountains of Switzerland named after people

References

External links

 www.pilatus.ch

Two-thousanders of Switzerland
Mountains of the Alps
Mountains of Obwalden
Mountains of Nidwalden
Tourist attractions in Switzerland
Cable cars in Switzerland
Tourist attractions in Nidwalden
Nidwalden–Obwalden border
Emmental Alps
Mountains of Switzerland
Pontius Pilate